The men's 4 × 400 metres relay event at the 1993 Summer Universiade was held at the UB Stadium in Buffalo, United States on 18 July 1993.

Results

References

Athletics at the 1993 Summer Universiade
1993